Triple Play 2001 is a baseball sports game released for the PlayStation, Microsoft Windows, and Game Boy Color in 2000.

Due to complaints about chopping frame rate issues from previous games, EA sports was able to make the previous Triple Play game at a full 30 FPS but this game fell short and received heavy criticism for taking a step back. They also introduced classic players that player could control in the game. Players can play a single player game, a full season, playoffs, or the Home Run Derby. Team selection and transfers come under player control. Once again Jim Hughson and Buck Martinez provide the commentary. This game was not released on Nintendo 64 unlike the previous version, and it's the only Game Boy Color version to get a release date.

Reception

The PlayStation version received favorable reviews, while the PC and Game Boy Color versions received mixed reviews, according to the review aggregation website GameRankings.

References

External links

2000 video games
Baseball video games
Triple Play video games
Game Boy Color games
PlayStation (console) games
THQ games
Treyarch games
Windows games
Video games developed in the United States